Maintenance Engineering is the discipline and profession of applying engineering concepts for the optimization of equipment, procedures, and departmental budgets to achieve better maintainability, reliability, and availability of equipment.

Maintenance, and hence maintenance engineering, is increasing in importance due to rising amounts of equipment, systems, machineries and infrastructure.  Since the Industrial Revolution, devices, equipment, machinery and structures have grown increasingly complex, requiring a host of personnel, vocations and related systems needed to maintain them. Prior to 2006, the United States spent approximately US$300 billion annually on plant maintenance and operations alone. Maintenance is to ensure a unit is fit for purpose, with maximum availability at minimum costs. A person practicing maintenance engineering is known as a maintenance engineer.

Maintenance engineer's description 

A maintenance engineer should possess significant knowledge of statistics, probability, and logistics, and in the fundamentals of the operation of the equipment and machinery he or she is responsible for. A maintenance engineer should also possess high interpersonal, communication, and management skills, as well as the ability to make decisions quickly.

Typical responsibilities include:
 Assure optimization of the maintenance organization structure
 Analysis of repetitive equipment failures
 Estimation of maintenance costs and evaluation of alternatives
 Forecasting of spare parts
 Assessing the needs for equipment replacements and establish replacement programs when due
 Application of scheduling and project management principles to replacement programs
 Assessing required maintenance tools and skills required for efficient maintenance of equipment
 Assessing required skills for maintenance personnel
 Reviewing personnel transfers to and from maintenance organizations
 Assessing and reporting safety hazards associated with maintenance of equipment

Maintenance engineering education 

Institutions across the world have recognised the need for maintenance engineering. Maintenance engineers usually hold a degree in mechanical engineering, industrial engineering, or other engineering disciplines. In recent years specialised bachelor and master courses have developed. The bachelor degree program in maintenance engineering at the German-Jordanian University in Amman is addressing the need, as well as the master's program in maintenance engineering at Luleå University of Technology. With an increased demand for Chartered Engineers, The University of Central Lancashire in United Kingdom has developed a MSc in maintenance engineering currently under accreditation with the Institution of Engineering and Technology and a top-up Bachelor of Engineering with honour degree for technicians holding a Higher National Diploma and seeking a progression in their professional career.

See also
 Aircraft maintenance engineering
 Asset management
 Auto mechanic
 Civil engineer
 Computerized maintenance management system
 Computer repair technician
 Electrician
 Electrical Technologist
 Industrial Engineering
 Marine fuel management
 Mechanic
 Millwright (machinery maintenance)
 Maintenance, repair and operations (MRO)
 Reliability centered maintenance (RCM)
 Reliability engineering
 Preventive maintenance
 Product lifecycle management
 Stationary engineer
 Total productive maintenance (TPM)
 Six Sigma for maintenance

Associations
 INFORMS
 Institute of Industrial Engineers

References

https://web.archive.org/web/20110710024804/http://www.gju.edu.jo/page.aspx?id=36&type=s&lng=en&page=159

Industrial engineering
Industrial occupations
Maintenance
Engineering disciplines
Engineering occupations
Reliability engineering
Product lifecycle management
Mechanical engineering